Yuliya Markovich (born 11 July 1989) is a Kazakhstani handball player. She was born in Kyzylorda and competed at the 2008 Summer Olympics in Beijing, where the Kazakhstani team placed 10th.

References

External links

Kazakhstani female handball players
Olympic handball players of Kazakhstan

Handball players at the 2008 Summer Olympics
People from Kyzylorda
1989 births
Living people
20th-century Kazakhstani women
21st-century Kazakhstani women